Camptodes is a genus of sap-feeding beetles in the family Nitidulidae. There are about nine described species in Camptodes.

Species
These nine species belong to the genus Camptodes:
 Camptodes communis Erichson, 1843
 Camptodes contracta Erichson, 1843
 Camptodes czwalinai Reitter, 1875
 Camptodes gaumeri Sharp, 1890
 Camptodes helvola Erichson, 1843
 Camptodes nigerrimus Parsons, 1943
 Camptodes ornatus Motschulsky, 1863
 Camptodes texanus Schaeffer, 1904
 Camptodes viridipennis Fauvel, 1861

References

Further reading

 
 

Nitidulidae
Articles created by Qbugbot